Allah Selamatkan Sultan Kami (Jawi: , ; God, Save Our Sultan) is the state anthem of Pahang officially adopted in 1925. The anthem was based on the song Perang Pahang ('Pahang War'), re-arranged by Miss Dorothy Lilian Sworder in December 1924.

History
In 1924, during the reign of Sultan Abdullah al-Mu'tassim Billah, a competition was arranged in Pahang to select a tune for the state anthem. One of the entries was submitted by Miss Dorothy Lilian Sworder (1892–1982), daughter of the Agricultural Officer at Pekan, who was paying he father a visit. Miss Sworder was a talented musician and an LRAM. Her composition, which was the re-arranged version of the song Perang Pahang, was selected and presented by the British Resident of Pahang, H.W Thompson to the Sultan on 1 May 1925. The music score of the anthem was sent to Kuala Lumpur and performed for the first time by the State Band during the meeting of the Federal council during the same year.

Lyrics
The current official anthem is a modified version of the original lyrics. At the third line, the original term Kebawah Duli Yang Maha Mulia was revised to Duli Yang Maha Mulia. Similarly, at the seventh line, the Ke Bawah Duli Raja Kami was revised to Duli Tuanku Raja Kami.

Notes

References 
 
 
 
 

Pahang
Anthems of Malaysia